Muana is a village situated in Jind district in the state of Haryana, north India.

History 
Muana is situated near Safidon, a historic place described as Sarpdaman in the epic Mahabharta, and near Asandh which was the capital of Jarasandh.

Muana is a very old and historic village. Before about 750 years ago, it was ruled by the Varah Rajputs. Then it was won by Madadh Rajputs and came under Madadh 360 Riyasat. It was won by four Madadh brothers, Thakur Mohan Singh, Thakur Nahar Singh, Thakur Bishan Singh and Thakur That Singh. The descendants of these four brothers are still there and known as Moh and Rawat Panna, Nahar Panna, Bisty Panna and Thob Panna.

Tourist Places

Maharana Pratap Chowk  
Maharana Pratap Chowk is Situated on Main Bus Stand in Village Muana.

Devi Durga Mata Mandir 
A very old devi Durga Mata Mandir is situated in Muana. Each and every year on " Dipawali" people gathered here for worship. No matter currently, where they are living.

New Durga Devi Mandir Near Nodiya Tirtha is situated in Muana. Now there are many rajput haveli in muana.

References 

Villages in Jind district